The Island of Ireland Peace Park and its surrounding park, also called the Irish Peace Park or Irish Peace Tower in Messines, near Ypres in Flanders, Belgium, is a war memorial to the soldiers of the island of Ireland who died, were wounded or are missing from World War I, during Ireland's involvement in the conflict. The tower memorial is close to the site of the June 1917 battle of Messines Ridge, during which the 16th (Irish) Division fought alongside the 36th (Ulster) Division.

Development
Because of the events of the Easter Rebellion in 1916 and the partition of Ireland under the Anglo-Irish Treaty in 1922 and the Irish Civil War that followed it, little was done in the Republic of Ireland to commemorate the Irish dead from the Great War or World War II. Those countries who were engaged in the Great War all preserve the memory of their fallen soldiers with national monuments in the Western Front area. This led to some ill-feeling in the already crowded emotions of the conflict on the island, and perhaps was highlighted when Northern Ireland's community's Ulster Tower Thiepval in France was one of the first memorials erected.

This Tower memorial, however, serves not to "redress the balance" but rather to recall the sacrifices of those from the island of Ireland from all political and religious traditions who fought and died in the war. It also serves as a symbol of modern-day reconciliation. The Tower houses bronze cubicles containing record books listing the known dead, which are publicly accessible copies of the originals belonging to the National War Memorial, Islandbridge, Dublin.

The project was initiated by a member of the Irish Parliament (Dail Eireann), Paddy Harte TD, who, together with a community activist, Glen Barr from Northern Ireland, established 'A Journey of Reconciliation Trust'. The Trust was a broad-based, cross-border, organisation with offices in Dublin.   The Trust was made up of representatives of the main churches in Ireland and professional political and representatives and community leaders from both parts of Ireland under the leadership of Paddy Harte and Glenn Barr.

The Irish government became involved in part funding the project together with the Northern Ireland Office. Statutory and private bodies rolled in behind the project and within two years of the initiation of the JRT the Island of Ireland Peace Park and Celtic Round tower was complete.  It was formally opened by the Irish President Mary McAleese who, in the presence of Queen Elizabeth of the United Kingdom and King Albert of Belgium, led the wreath-laying ceremony in the afternoon of 11 November 1998. It was the first time an Irish State officially acknowledged the soldiers from Ireland who died in WW1.  This was also a seminal moment in Irish history when an Irish Head of State and a British Monarch met publicly in a joint ceremony. The Park is maintained by the Commonwealth War Graves Commission on behalf of the Office of Public Works in Ireland.  Prior to the Island of Ireland Peace Park, no Irish government dignitary had ever attended any WW1 Remembrance Service either in Ireland or at the Menin Gate. At an official ceremony on 11 November 1998 the Irish President apologised on behalf of the Republic of Ireland to the families of the fallen for what she called the 'national amnesia' in remembering the soldiers of WW1 from the Island of Ireland.

Design

The  tower is in the traditional design of an Irish round tower and is partially built with stone from a former British Army barracks in Tipperary, the remainder of the stone from a work-house outside Mullingar, County Westmeath.

The design has a unique aspect that allows the sun to light the interior only on the 11th hour of the 11th day of the 11th month, the anniversary of the armistice that ended the war and the time for the minute's silence on Remembrance Day.

A commemorative ceremony is held yearly in the park on Armistice Day in conjunction with similar ceremonies at the nearby multi-national Menin Gate Memorial in Ypres.

Unveiling
The tower was unveiled in the afternoon on 11 November 1998 by President Mary McAleese of Ireland, in the presence of Queen Elizabeth II of the United Kingdom and King Albert II of Belgium.

In her speech, President McAleese said:

Speaking at the Park on the anniversary of the Battle of Messines Ridge on 7 June 2004, the Irish Minister for Foreign Affairs Dermot Ahern commented that honouring the spirit of the Irish killed in the First World War can teach how to advance the Northern Ireland peace process in Northern Ireland.  adding:

Peace Pledge
A bronze tablet on a granite pillar positioned in the centre circle of the park bears the following inscription, entitled:

The park

 Inside the entrance gate on the left are four granite pillars with plaques in four languages (Irish, English, Dutch and French), commemorating the dedication and opening and dedication of the park on 11 November 1998. 
 The park surrounding the round tower contains thirteen smaller stone structures:
 There are three pillars giving the killed, wounded and missing of each division
 *36th (Ulster) Division – 32,186
 *10th (Irish) Division – 9,363
 *16th (Irish) Division – 28,398
An upright tablet listing the counties of Ireland, the names flowing together to suggest the unity of death
A bronze tablet depicting a plan of the battle area
Nine stone tablets with prose, poems and letters from Irish servicemen

Messines Peace Village
The completion of the Peace Park ultimately led to the development and construction of the Messines Peace Village, an international rural hostel equipped for seminars and meetings, ideal for associations, companies, youth and school groups.

The first stone was placed on 7 June 2005 by Taoiseach na hÉireann (Prime Minister of Ireland) Bertie Ahern in the presence of the Burgomaster of Messines, Sandy Evrard and the Flemish Minister of Administrative Affairs, Foreign Policy, Media and Tourism, Geert Bourgeois.

Only one year later, the Peace Village was officially opened. The inauguration took place on 7 June 2006 by the Irish Minister of Foreign Affairs, Dermot Ahern, the British Minister for Northern Ireland, David Hanson, the Flemish Minister of Administrative Affairs, Foreign Policy, Media and Tourism, Geert Bourgeois and Sandy Evrard, the Mayor of Messines.

See also
 Irish National War Memorial Gardens, Dublin, Ireland
 Peace Park, Dublin, Ireland
 Menin Gate Memorial, Ypres, West Flanders, Belgium
 Ulster Tower Memorial, Thiepval, France.

References

External links
World War I: Carte de Route: Guide of the Island of Ireland Peace Park

Further reading
 Bryan Cooper (1918): The 10th (Irish) Division in Gallipoli, Irish Academic Press (1993), (2003) .
 Cyril Falls: History of the 36th (Ulster) Division, Constable & Robinson (1996) .
 Desmond & Jean Bowen: Heroic Option: The Irish in the British Army, Pen & Sword Books (2005) .
 Keith Jeffery: Ireland and the Great War, Cambridge University Press, (November 2000) .
 Terence Denman: Ireland's unknown Soldiers: The 16th (Irish) Division in the Great War, Irish Academic Press (1992), (2003) .
 Timothy Bowman: Irish Regiments in the Great War, Manchester University Press (2003), .
  David Murphy: Irish Regiments in the World Wars, Osprey Publishing (2007), 
  David Murphy:  The Irish Brigades, 1685-2006, A gazetteer of Irish Military Service past and present, Four Courts Press (2007) The Military Heritage of Ireland Trust. 
  Stephen Walker: Forgotten Soldiers; The Irishmen shot at dawn, Gill & Nacmillan (2007), 
  John Horne ed.: Our War 'Ireland and the Great War': The Thomas Davis Lectures, The Royal Irish Academy, Dublin (2008) 

History of Ireland (1801–1923)
Ireland in World War I
World War I memorials in Belgium
Peace parks